Gilles Boisvert (born February 16, 1940) is a Canadian artist and sculptor.

Early career
Gilles Boisvert was born in Montreal, Quebec, Canada. He studied at the Montreal School of Fine Arts, starting in 1958, and later studied etching and engraving under Albert Dumouchel.

Artistic experience
Gilles Boisvert has spent periods of residence in Mexico, California and Paris, France and has held over forty solo exhibitions in Canada and abroad. He has held major solo exhibitions at the Montreal Museum of Contemporary Art, the Musée d'art contemporain des Laurentides and the Musée national des beaux-arts du Québec. His works are included in major collections in Canada, the U.S., the U.K. and Japan. His is one of the founding members of Atelier de l'Ïle located in Val-David, Québec.

Style and technique
Gilles Boisvert is of the generation of artists of the sixties, on the verge of the formalists and plasticians and just after the automatists. While in the U.S. Action Painting was just finishing and Pop-Art starting, Boisvert chose to be one of the pioneers of an original art form, closer to people, that would later come to be known as the Quebec Pop-Art movement. Highly prolific and avantgarde, Gilles Boisvert has worked at engraving, lithography, photography, drawing, painting, cinema, installations and sculpture. In addition, in the 1990s, he developed an interest in computer graphics and website design, leading to work in the multimedia field. He has also created more than a dozen monumental works that are on public display at buildings in Canada and the U.S.

Major works
1966, Candide, installation 
1968, Opération Déclic, serigraphy on paper
1969, The BP. Snow Tire, acrylic on canvas, transfer
1972, Oui, je me cache, (part of the album Les Oiseaux) serigraphy  
1973, Radio Canada, mural, 10’ X 90’, Montreal, Quebec
1978, Québec Provincial Police Building, 8 murals, Quebec City, Quebec
1982, Centre d’Accueil Dante, 5 murals, copper relief, Montreal, Quebec
1983, Centre Eloria Lepage, mural, copper relief, 8' x 38' Montreal, Quebec  
1984, The Terrace at Turnberry, mural, zinc and steel relief, 13’ x 7’ x 2" Miami, Florida 
1986, Vanier College, polychrome wood relief, ±25’ x 8’, St. Laurent, Quebec
1986, Vive l'eau, Nordic Prince, cruise ship (home port: Miami, Florida), mural, acrylic on canvas, 3’ X 16’
1988, Théâtre La Licorne, sculptured intervention on doors, 9’ x 3.5’, Montreal, Quebec
1988, Vire au vent, painted steel and raw steel, Lachine, Quebec 
1989, L’homme Volant, Raymond Lacombe Transport, sculpture, painted copper and wood, 8’ x 9’ x 3’, Montreal, Quebec
1994, Grand geste-couleur, Ste-Thérèse High School, polychrome wood relief, 8’ x 25’, Ste-Thérèse, Quebec
1987-95, L'Arbre des generations, sculpture, painted steel, Lachine, Quebec 
2006, Le presse-oiseau, sculpture, Tinted wood, 13' x 6' x 3', symposium on sculpture Ombre et lumière, Saint-Faustin, Quebec

Sources 

1940 births
Living people
Artists from Montreal
Canadian male painters
École des beaux-arts de Montréal alumni
Sculptors from Quebec
20th-century Canadian painters
20th-century Canadian sculptors
Canadian male sculptors
20th-century Canadian male artists
21st-century Canadian painters
21st-century Canadian sculptors
21st-century Canadian male artists